Narrominaspis longi is an extinct buchanosteid arthrodire placoderm.  Its fossils, and those of the acanthothoracid, Connemarraspis, have been found in the late Lochkovian-aged marine strata of the Connemarra Formation in Australia.

It is considered a basal buchanosteid.

References

Buchanosteidae
Placoderms of Australia